The Amata is a river in Gauja National Park in the Middle Latvian Lowland.  It flows from lake Kukala in Vidzeme, 66 km, to the river Gauja. The riverbanks feature Devonian red sandstone cliffs , and rapids. The River Amata is one of Latvia's fastest rivers. It has one of the deepest and most unusual valleys of all the rivers in Vidzeme, with up to 45 m high sandstone and dolomite bedrock banks.

One of the steepest bank of Amata is the Zvārtes rock. It is more than 350 million years old and its height measures 20 m. It is one of the most popular sandstone outcrops in Latvia.
Folk tales tell that Zvārtes rock used to be a meeting place of witches on Whitsunday, St. John’s Day and Christmas. On those days they rushed on brooms from pine forests of the surroundings.

References

External links
 

Rivers of Latvia
Gauja basin
Cēsis Municipality
Vidzeme